The Presidents' Trophy is an annual Canadian sports award presented to the most outstanding defensive player in U Sports football. The trophy was first presented in 1980 after having been championed by two past presidents of Canadian university sports bodies. The name indirectly honours Ed Zemrau, past president of U Sports (then known as the Canadian Interuniversity Athletics Union); and Robert Doty, past president of Canada's university football championship game, then known as the College Bowl and now as the Vanier Cup.

List of Presidents' Trophy winners

See also
Hec Crighton Trophy
J. P. Metras Trophy
Peter Gorman Trophy
Russ Jackson Award

References

U Sports football trophies and awards